Chaohu is a county-level city of Anhui Province, People's Republic of China, it is under the administration of the prefecture-level city of Hefei. Situated on the northeast and southeast shores of Lake Chao, from which the city was named, Chaohu is under the administration of Hefei, the provincial capital, and is the latter's easternmost county-level division.

Formerly it was a prefecture-level city, which held administration over Wuwei, Lujiang, He and Hanshan counties until it dissolved on August 22, 2011. The Anhui provincial government announced in a controversial decision that the prefecture-level city Chaohu was to be split into three parts and absorbed into neighboring cities. Juchao District was renamed to Chaohu as a county-level city under Hefei's administration.

Climate

Administrative divisions
Chaohu City is divided to 6 Subdistricts, 11 towns and 1 townships.
Subdistricts

Towns

Townships
Miaogang Township

Notable people
Zhou Yu (175 - 210), Three Kingdoms era military general of the Kingdom of Wu
Ding Ruchang (1836–1895), Qing Dynasty naval commander and captain of battleship Dingyuan
Feng Yuxiang, warlord in the Republican Era
Xu Haifeng (b. 1957), first Chinese gold medalist for Men's 50 m Pistol in the 1984 Summer Olympics held in Los Angeles
Zhang Zhizhong, general in the National Revolutionary Army of the Republic of China.

References

External links
Government website of Chaohu (available in Chinese and English)

Cities in Anhui
Hefei
County-level divisions of Anhui